The Politics of Muzaffargarh takes place at the municipal, provincial and federal levels of the government. ؐMuzaffargarh is a multiethnic, multilingual, multicultural and multireligious city. Tthere are one Municipal Corporation, six Municipal committees, thirteen Town committee and five
 Thesil councils accorrding to he Punjab Local Government Act 2019. At a national level, Muzaffargarh is very important in provincial and national politics.

Political Families 
The Khars, Nawabs, Hinjras, Dastis, Qureshis, Jatois, Gurmani، Gopangs, Chandias, Bukharis, Laghari and Sials families are most infuencial on politics of Muzaffargarh.

Bukharis
 Abdullah Shah Bukhari
 Syeda Zehra Batool wife of Abdullah Shah Bukhari
 Syed Basit Sultan Bukhari Son of Abdullah Shah Bukhari
 Syed Haroon Ahmed Sultan Bokhari Son of Abdullah Shah Bukhari
 Ms. Maria Batool, Daughter of Abdullah Shah Bukhari, who serve as Tehsil Nazim
 Jamil Ahmad Hussain Bukhari Brother of Syeda Zehra Batool (Member National Assembly during 1997-99)
 Muhammad Raza Hussain Bukhari
 Makhdoom Altaf Hussain Bukhari
 Syed Shahbaz Ghous Bukhari  PP-269 (Muzaffargarh-I)

Chandias
 Azhar Abbas Chandia
 Ajmal Chandia contested Constituency PP-270 (Muzaffargarh-III)
 Akram Chandia, Chairman, Municipal Committee

Dastis
Dasti is a Baloch tribe. People of this tribe also found in Muzaffargarh along with Punjab, Pakistan and Sindh. 
 Abdul Hamid Khan Dasti
 Amjad Hameed Khan Dasti
 Tehmina Dasti daughter of Sardar Amjad Dasti
 Abdul Hayi Dasti
 Jamshed Dasti

Gopangs
 Sardar Aamir Talal Khan Gopang

Gurmanis
 Mushtaq Ahmed Gurmani
 Muhammad Zeeshan Gurmani

Hanjras
 Malik Sultan Mehmood Hanjra
 Malik Ghulam Qasim Hanjra

Jatois
 Abdul Qayyum Khan Jatoi

Khars
The Khars are 7 brothers, 5 brothers joined politics while 2 brothers decided to remain landlord. Ghulam Mustafa Khar is head and the family and in politics since 1960.
 Ghulam Murtaza Raheem Khar
 Ghulam Mustafa Khar, former Governor of Punjab and former Chief Minister of Punjab
 Ghulam Noor Rabbani Khar, politician
 Hina Rabbani Khar, daughter of Ghulam Noor Rabbani Khar
 Malik Ghulam Raza Rabbani Khar
 Malik Ghulam Arbi Khar MNA 1993
 Safina Saima Khar wife of Malik Ghulam Arbi Khar

Lagharis
 Khurrum Sohail Khan Laghari

Nawabs
Nawabzada Nasrullah Khan was prominent political figure in Pakistan and head of Nawab family. Following member of Nawab family are / were active in politics.
 Nawabzada Nasrullah Khan
 Nawabzada Mansoor Ahmed Khan
 Nawabzada Iftikhar Ahmed Khan Babar

Qureshi
 Mian Alamdar Abbas Qureshi
 Mohsin Ali Qureshi
 Muhammad Imran Qureshi
 Shabbir Ali Qureshi

Sials
 Mehr Irshad Ahmed Sial

Language politics

2013 General Elections

Members of the 1National Assembly (2013-2018)

Members of the Provincial Assembly of the Punjab (2013-2018)

2018 General Elections

Members of the National Assembly (2018-2023)

Members of the Provincial Assembly of the Punjab (2018-2023)

List of politicians 
 Abdul Hamid Khan Dasti
 Abdul Hayi Dasti
 Abdul Qayyum Khan Jatoi
 Amjad Hameed Khan Dasti
 Azhar Abbas Chandia
 Ghulam Murtaza Raheem Khar
 Ghulam Mustafa Khar, former Governor of Punjab and former Chief Minister of Punjab
 Ghulam Noor Rabbani Khar, politician
 Hammad Nawaz Khan
 Hina Rabbani Khar, former Foreign Minister and the first female foreign minister
 Nawabzada Iftikhar Ahmed Khan Babar - PPPP MNA from NA-184 Muzaffargarh-IV
 Jamshed Dasti founder Awami Raj Party
 Khurrum Sohail Khan Laghari
 Liaqat Baloch
 Mian Alamdar Abbas Qureshi
 Malik Ahmad Karim Qaswar Langrial
 Malik Ghulam Arbi Khar
 Malik Ghulam Qasim Hanjra
 Malik Ghulam Raza Rabbani Khar
 Mehr Irshad Ahmed Sial
 Muhammad Aoon Hamid
 Muhammad Ashraf Khan Rind
 Muhammad Raza Hussain Bukhari
 Mohsin Ali Qureshi
 Mushtaq Ahmed Gurmani
 Niaz Hussain Khan
 Nawabzada Mansoor Ahmed Khan
 Nawabzada Nasrullah Khan, A prominent political figure in Pakistan
 Rana Muhammad Afzal
 Sardar Abad Dogar, Ex Tehsil Nazim
 Shabbir Ali Qureshi
 Safina Saima Khar
 Sardar Ashiq Hussain, politician
 Sardar Aamir Talal Khan Gopang
 Sultan Mehmood, politician
 Syed Basit Sultan Bukhari
 Syed Muhammad Sibtain Raza
 Tehmina Dasti
 Zehra Batool

Constituencies of Muzaffargarh

Provincial Assembly

General elections 2008 and 2013
 PP-251 (Muzaffargarh-I)  
 PP-252 (Muzaffargarh-II) 
 PP-253 (Muzaffargarh-III) 
 PP-254 (Muzaffargarh-IV) 
 PP-255 (Muzaffargarh-V) 
 PP-256 (Muzaffargarh-VI) 
 PP-257 (Muzaffargarh-VII) 
 PP-258 (Muzaffargarh-VIII) 
 PP-259 (Muzaffargarh-IX) 
 PP-260 (Muzaffargarh-X)
 PP-261 (Muzaffargarh-XI)

General elections 2018
 Constituency PP-268 (Muzaffargarh-I)
 Constituency PP-269 (Muzaffargarh-II)
 Constituency PP-270 (Muzaffargarh-III)
 Constituency PP-271 (Muzaffargarh-IV)
 Constituency PP-272 (Muzaffargarh-V)
 Constituency PP-273 (Muzaffargarh-VI)
 Constituency PP-274 (Muzaffargarh-VII)
 Constituency PP-275 (Muzaffargarh-VIII)
 Constituency PP-276 (Muzaffargarh-IX)
 Constituency PP-277 (Muzaffargarh-X)
 Constituency PP-278 (Muzaffargarh-XI)
 Constituency PP-279 (Muzaffargarh-XII)

National Assembly

3RD NATIONAL ASSEMBLY OF PAKISTANFROM 1962-1964
 NW-59 (Muzaffargarh-cum-D.G. Khan) - Mr. Ghulam Mustafa
 NW-58 (MuzaffargarhI) - Mr. Nasrullah KhanKhangarh, The. And Distt.

General Election 2018
 NA-176 (Muzaffargarh-I)
 NA-177 (Muzaffargarh-II)
 NA-178 (Muzaffargarh-III)
 NA-181 (Muzaffargarh-I)
 NA-182 (Muzaffargarh-II)
 NA-183 (Muzaffargarh-III)
 NA-184 (Muzaffargarh-IV)
 NA-185 (Muzaffargarh-V)
 NA-186 (Muzaffargarh-VI)

See also

Notes

References

See also
 List of Pakistani political families

External links

Politics of Muzaffargarh